Sawmill Brook is a tributary of Lawrence Brook in northwestern East Brunswick, New Jersey in the United States.

Course
It runs through the industrialized section between Harts Lane and Route 18. It then crosses Harts Lane and runs through Tices Lane Park. Another branch from the south joins it, and it crosses Tices Lane.

Accessibility
Sawmill Brook runs through heavily populated areas, so it is easy to access.

Sister tributaries
Beaverdam Brook
Great Ditch
Ireland Brook
Oakeys Brook
Sucker Brook
Terhune Run
Unnamed Brook in Rutgers Gardens, unofficially named Doc Brook
Unnamed Brook in Rutgers' Helyar Woods

See also
List of rivers in New Jersey

References

External links
USGS Coordinates in Google Maps

Rivers of Middlesex County, New Jersey
Tributaries of the Raritan River
Rivers of New Jersey
East Brunswick, New Jersey